Robert A. Maginn Jr. (born October 31, 1956) is an American businessman and political figure who served as the chairman of the Massachusetts Republican Party from 2011 to 2013.

Education
Maginn graduated summa cum laude from the University of Dayton with a B.S. in business administration and received three graduate degrees from Harvard University, including a Master of Divinity (MDiv) from Harvard Divinity School, Master of Business Administration (MBA) with honors from Harvard Business School and Master of Liberal Arts (ALM) in government from Harvard Extension School.

Career

Business 
From 1983 to 2000, Maginn worked for Bain & Company as a management consultant and later as a senior partner, board member, and director. From 1997-2001, he was a director of iBasis. In 1998, he co-founded Jenzabar, an internet company that provides software to colleges and universities, as chairman of the Board of Directors and CEO. Maginn is an operating partner at Energy Impact Partners, and a fellow at Harvard University Advanced Leadership Initiative.

From 2006 to 2010, he was a non-executive director, chairman of the Nominating & Corporate Governance Committee, member of the Audit Committee and member of Compensation Committee at ICx Technologies. He was also chairman of New Media Japan and managing member of New Media Investors,LLC.

Politics 
Maginn served as a member of the Republican Board of Governors and on Bob Dole, Mitt Romney, and Peter Torkildsen's finance committees. In 1998, Maginn was the Republican nominee for Treasurer and Receiver-General of Massachusetts. He lost to Democrat Shannon O'Brien 626,286 votes to 1,120,757.

On December 1, 2011, Maginn was elected Chairman of the Massachusetts Republican Party. He defeated former United States Attorney Frank L. McNamara Jr. 51 votes to 21. Maginn announced that he would not seek reelection as party chairman in 2013 following the defeat of Republican Presidential candidate W. Mitt Romney his former boss and friend.

Personal life
His father, Robert A. Maginn, Sr. is a chemical engineer and was the president of Midwestern Consolidated Enterprises Inc., a plastics manufacturer located in Dayton, Ohio. His mother, Valerie Maginn, was the company's vice president.

Maginn married his first wife in 1987. In 2001, Maginn married Chai Ling, one of the student leaders of the Tian'anmen Square protests of 1989 and the founder of All Girls Allowed, a humanitarian organization that aims to stop the human rights violations related to China's One-Child Policy. They have three daughters and reside in Belmont, Massachusetts.

References

1956 births
Harvard Business School alumni
University of Dayton alumni
Massachusetts Republican Party chairs
Businesspeople from Cambridge, Massachusetts
Bain & Company employees
Living people
American corporate directors
American chairpersons of corporations
People from Belmont, Massachusetts
Harvard Extension School alumni
Harvard Divinity School alumni